Kreshnik is an Albanian name that may refer to
Given name
Kreshnik Çipi (born 1958), Albanian politician
Kreshnik Gjata (born 1983), Albanian swimmer 
Kreshnik Ivanaj (born 1982), Albanian football player 
Kreshnik Qato (born 1978), Albanian boxer 
Kreshnik Sinanaj (born 1986), Albanian football player 
Kreshnik Spahiu (born 1969), Albanian lawyer and politician 
Nik Xhelilaj (born Kreshnik Xhelilaj in 1983), Albanian film and stage actor

Surname
Rustemi Kreshnik (born 1984), Albanian-Belgian kickboxer

See also 
Krajišnik (surname)

Albanian masculine given names
Albanian-language surnames